Nicholas Wall may refer to:
Nicholas Wall (judge) (1945–2017), English judge, President of the Family Division
Nicholas Wall (politician) (1884–1939), Irish politician
Nick Wall (1906–1983), Canadian jockey
Nick Wall (squash player) (born 2000), English squash player